The 1974–75 season was the 51st season in the existence of AEK Athens F.C. and the 16th consecutive season in the top flight of Greek football. They competed in the Alpha Ethniki and the Greek Cup. The season began on 29 September 1974 and finished on 8 June 1975.

Overview

The summer of 1974 was a milestone in the history of AEK. It was the beginning of one the most glorious periods in the history of the club. The political situation in Greece was normalizing, the "government commissioners" left the sports clubs and Loukas Barlos, after elections, got 58% and the wheel of AEK in his hands. Barlos, a large industrialist of the time with the main occupation of the bauxite trade from the region of Boeotia, but above all a huge football fan, was to become the president-symbol in the history of the club. He envisioned a team that would surpass the Greek standards and without sparing any money, he started its "building", by hiring František Fadrhonc as coach, a specialist in both training and coaching at the time and co-creator of the "flying" Dutchmen of the early 70's, alongside Rinus Michels. Fadrhonc was an unreachable name for the Greek standards of the time. He brought to AEK a series of innovations both in the form of training and coaching, as well as in its organization structure. The "grandfather", as he was nicknamed, due to his age, set new standards even to the sports equipment and the team's clothing. AEK became the first Greek club to be dressed by a large sportswear brand. The two legally allowed positions of foreign players were filled by two Germans, the striker Walter Wagner from Austria Wien and Timo Zahnleiter from 1860 München, who was one of the first to show the Greek Stadiums the role of the defensive midfielder. From the domestic football market Barlos collected and delivered to the hands of Fadrhonc some of the best and most impressive players. The fast winger Christos Ardizoglou from Apollon Athens and the diligent scorer Georgios Dedes, alongside the defender Giorgos Skrekis from Panionios, arrived at the club.

The results were impressive and the renewed AEK finished second, two points behind Olympiacos, presenting the best attack and defense of the league. In the Greek Cup AEK reached the quarter-finals, where they were eliminated in Thessaloniki by Iraklis. The management and the performance of the club, showed that the team along with their fans were about to experience greatness for the time to come.

Players

Squad information

NOTE: The players are the ones that have been announced by the AEK Athens' press release. No edits should be made unless a player arrival or exit is announced. Updated 30 June 1975, 23:59 UTC+3.

Transfers

In

 a.  and Kostas Panagiotopoulos, Babis Psimogiannos and Ivan Kypritidis as exchange.

 b.  plus Nikos Karoulias.

Out

Overall transfer activity

Expenditure:  ₯5,000,000

Income:  ₯0

Net Total:  ₯5,000,000

Pre-season and friendlies

Alpha Ethniki

League table

Results summary

Results by Matchday

Fixtures

Greek Cup

AEK Athens entered the Greek Cup at the Round of 32

Matches

Statistics

Squad statistics

! colspan="9" style="background:#FFDE00; text-align:center" | Goalkeepers
|-

! colspan="9" style="background:#FFDE00; color:black; text-align:center;"| Defenders
|-

! colspan="9" style="background:#FFDE00; color:black; text-align:center;"| Midfielders
|-

! colspan="9" style="background:#FFDE00; color:black; text-align:center;"| Forwards
|-

|}

Disciplinary record

|-
! colspan="14" style="background:#FFDE00; text-align:center" | Goalkeepers

|-
! colspan="14" style="background:#FFDE00; color:black; text-align:center;"| Defenders

|-
! colspan="14" style="background:#FFDE00; color:black; text-align:center;"| Midfielders

|-
! colspan="14" style="background:#FFDE00; color:black; text-align:center;"| Forwards

|}

References

External links
AEK Athens F.C. Official Website

AEK Athens F.C. seasons
AEK Athens